Inthawichayanon (c. 1817 – 23 November 1897) was the 7th Ruler of Chiang Mai and Ruler of Lanna from 1870 until his death in 1897. His daughter, Princess Dara Rasmi of Chiang Mai became King Rama V's Princess Consort. During his reign the ties of the previously independent tributary state with the central government in Bangkok were intensified, culminating in the creation of the Monthon Phayap in 1892, by which Lanna was formally annexed.

Born on c. 1817 as Prince Inthanon (เจ้าอินทนนท์) to Phraya Maha Phrom Khamkhong (พระยามหาพรหมคำคง), lord viceroy of Chiangmai, and Princess Khamla (คำหล้า). He is a grandson of Prince Khamfan, the 3rd ruler of Chiangmai. He was concerned about the preservation of the mountain forests in the Thai highlands. Before he died he ordered that his remains be kept at Doi Luang, the highest mountain of the Thanon Thong Chai Range, which was renamed Doi Inthanon after his death.

In 1883, a rumour that Queen Victoria of Great Britain intended to adopt his daughter, Dara Rasmi, spread from Burma to Chiangmai and Bangkok, alarmed Siamese government of British desire in Lanna. The Siamese King sent his brother, Prince Bijitprijakara, to Chiangmai to forward the King's proposal to Dara Rasmi.

He was only King Ruler in history who awarded Knight of the Order of the Royal House of Chakri.

References

|-

1897 deaths
Rulers of Chiang Mai
Chet Ton dynasty
People from Chiang Mai province
Year of birth unknown
19th-century Thai monarchs
1810s births